The China national under-19 basketball team is the national basketball team of the People's Republic of China and is governed by the Chinese Basketball Association. 
It represents the country in international under-19 and under-18 (under age 19 and under age 18) basketball competitions.

As reigning champion of Asia, China achieved the 7th place at the recent 2013 FIBA Under-19 World Championship. This was the best finish in its history and the best finish ever of an Asian nation at this tournament.

See also
China national basketball team
China national under-17 basketball team
China women's national under-19 basketball team

References

under
Men's national under-19 basketball teams